Master Diver usually refers to an experienced person in underwater diving or scuba diving.  In more formal settings, this may refer to someone who has completed a qualification program to receive the designation.

United States military
 Master diver (United States Navy)
 United States Army Master Diver, a qualification of United States Army engineer diver

Recreational diving
 Master Scuba Diver, a non-professional certification
 Divemaster, a professional certification